Eternal Melodies (Italian: Melodie eterne) is a 1940 Italian historical drama film directed by Carmine Gallone and starring Gino Cervi, Conchita Montenegro and Luisella Beghi. It was one of several musical biopics directed by Gallone. The film was shot at Cinecittà in Rome.

Synopsis
A heavily fictionalized account of the life of the Austrian composer Wolfgang Amadeus Mozart (1756–1791).

Cast
 Gino Cervi as Wolfgang Amadeus Mozart
 Conchita Montenegro as Aloisia Weber Lange
 Luisella Beghi as Costanza Weber Mozart
 Maria Jacobini as Anna Maria Mozart
 Jone Salinas as Nannina Mozart
 Luigi Pavese as Leopoldo Mozart
 Paolo Stoppa as Haibl, clarinettista  
 Lauro Gazzolo as Il locandiere Deiner 
 Claudio Gora as L'imperatore Giuseppe
 Olga Vittoria Gentilli as L'imperatrice Maria Teresa
 Margherita Bagni as Signora Weber  
 Marisa Vernati as Sofia Weber 
 Armida Bonocore as Giuseppina Weber 
 Giulio Donadio as L'impresario Schikaneder
 Augusto Marcacci as Il musicista Salieri
 Sandro Ruffini as Il gentiluomo che commissiona il 'Requiem'  
 Giulio Stival as Il tenore Giuseppe Lange  
 Romolo Costa as Il compositore Schröder  
 Carlo Duse as Il conte Arco  
 Cesare Polacco as Haydn
 Alfredo Martinelli as Il signore invidioso  
 Giuseppe Varni as Un detrattore  
 Franco Pesce as Il direttore di scena

References

Bibliography 
 Moliterno, Gino. Historical Dictionary of Italian Cinema. Scarecrow Press, 2008.

External links 
 
 Melodie Eterne on All About Mozart

1940 films
Italian historical drama films
Italian black-and-white films
1940s historical drama films
1940s Italian-language films
Films directed by Carmine Gallone
Films set in the 18th century
Films set in Vienna
Films about classical music and musicians
Films about composers
Biographical films about musicians
Films about Wolfgang Amadeus Mozart
Cultural depictions of Antonio Salieri
Cultural depictions of Joseph II, Holy Roman Emperor
Films shot at Cinecittà Studios
1940 drama films
Films scored by Alessandro Cicognini
1940s Italian films